Froelich is a lunar impact crater on the far side of the Moon. It is located in the northern regions, just beyond the north-northwestern limb. Only a few kilometers separate this formation from the crater Lovelace to the north. Farther to the south is the crater Merrill, and to the southeast along the limb is the larger Brianchon.

This crater has a circular, symmetrical shape but the rim is worn and does not project very far above the surface. The inner walls are generally featureless, except for small craterlets along the eastern and southern sides. The interior floor has a low ridge in the northeastern quadrant and a small central rise.

Satellite craters
By convention these features are identified on lunar maps by placing the letter on the side of the crater midpoint that is closest to Froelich.

References

 
 
 
 
 
 
 
 
 
 
 
 

Impact craters on the Moon